The Royal Court Table of Zagreb was the main court of first instance in the Kingdom of Croatia-Slavonia between 1850 and 1918.

The Habsburg monarchy reorganized its judiciary in 1850 when the Tabula Banalis (Ban's Table) became the appellate court for all courts in Croatia and Slavonia, including the Land Court, renamed to the Royal County Court Table in 1862, and finally the Royal Court Table according to the Organization of Courts of the First Instance Act dated November 21, 1874. It was the court of first instance with criminal and major civil jurisdiction, while the subordinate courts from the area of central Croatia used it as an appellate court until 1850.

From 1862 the supreme court of the Kingdom of Croatia-Slavonia 
was the Table of Seven (Croatian: Stol sedmorice).

References

Legal history of Croatia
Croatia under Habsburg rule
Kingdom of Croatia-Slavonia
Defunct courts
1850 establishments in the Austrian Empire
1918 disestablishments in Austria-Hungary
Courts and tribunals established in 1850
Courts and tribunals disestablished in 1918
Disestablishments in the Kingdom of Hungary (1867–1918)